was a member of the Diet of Japan from the Liberal Democratic Party until resigning his office on January 24, 1989 following alleged involvement in the Recruit scandal, where Harada admitted Recruit had given him donations, in the form of seasonal summer gifts, for ten years. While the donations were not illegal, they raised questions of political ethics which eventually led Harada to resign. As a member of the Diet, Harada served as Minister of Economic Planning, and earned the close trust of Prime Minister Noboru Takeshita. He was the third minister to resign over the scandal. Harada had been appointed to direct the Ministry of Economic Planning only one month before his resignation. After party officials had already placed him as the chair of a committee in charge of investigating the Recruit stock scandal, where he had concluded that nothing illegal had taken place. In 1992, Harada backed Keizō Obuchi as new leader of the Liberal Democratic Party.  replaced Harada as Minister of Economic Planning.

Scouting 
Harada served as a member of the National Board of Governors of the Boy Scouts of Nippon and President of the Scout Parliamentary Caucus. In 1989, Harada was awarded the 200th Bronze Wolf, the only distinction of the World Organization of the Scout Movement, awarded by the World Scout Committee for exceptional services to world Scouting. In 1985 he also received the highest distinction of the Scout Association of Japan, the Golden Pheasant Award.

References

Bibliography 

 
 
 
 
 
 
 
 

 

Dr. László Nagy, 250 Million Scouts, The World Scout Foundation and Dartnell Publishers, 1985, complete list through 1981

External links

17 Bronze Wolf Recipients from Japan

Full list of Japanese Bronze Wolf recipients
Scout Association of Japan

|-

|-

|-

|-

Economic planning ministers of Japan
Government ministers of Japan
Members of the House of Representatives (Japan)
Politicians from Osaka Prefecture
Kansai University alumni
1919 births
1997 deaths
Liberal Democratic Party (Japan) politicians
Recipients of the Bronze Wolf Award
Scouting in Japan